A war cabinet is a committee formed by a government in a time of war to efficiently and effectively conduct that war.  It is usually a subset of the full executive cabinet of ministers, although it is quite common for a war cabinet to have senior military officers and opposition politicians as members.

United Kingdom

First World War

The British War Cabinet
Prior to the First World War, the British had the Committee of Imperial Defence. During World War I, it became a war committee.

During the First World War, lengthy cabinet discussions came to be seen as a source of vacillation in Britain's war effort.

The number of cabinet ministries grew throughout the nineteenth century. Following dissatisfaction at the conduct of the Crimean War, Disraeli proposed that the number of cabinet members never exceed 10 (he had 12 at the time). However, this didn't happen, and the number of ministries continued to grow: 15 in 1859, 21 in 1914, and 23 in 1916. Despite talk of "inner circles" within the Asquith Administration, all committees reported to the 23 cabinet ministers, whose priorities were diverse in nature, and who had final say over war policy formation for the first two years of World War I.  This cumbersome arrangement could not stand; a more efficient way of prosecuting the war was needed.

In December 1916 it was proposed that Prime Minister H. H. Asquith should delegate decision-making to a small, three-man committee chaired by the Secretary of State for War, David Lloyd George. Asquith initially agreed (provided the committee reported to him and he retained the right to attend if he chose) before changing his mind after being infuriated by a news story in The Times which portrayed the proposed change as a defeat for him. The political crisis grew from this point until Asquith was forced to resign as Prime Minister; he was succeeded by David Lloyd George who thereupon formed a small war cabinet. The original members of the war cabinet were:

David Lloyd George
Lord Curzon of Kedleston (Lord President of the Council)
Bonar Law (Chancellor of the Exchequer)
Arthur Henderson (December 1916 – August 1917)
Alfred, Lord Milner (December 1916 – April 1918)

Lloyd George, Curzon and Bonar Law served throughout the life of the war cabinet.  Later members included:

Jan Smuts (June 1917 – January 1919)
George Barnes (May 1917 – January 1919)
Edward Carson (July 1917 – January 1918)
Austen Chamberlain (April 1918 – October 1919)
Sir Eric Geddes (January 1919 – October 1919)

Unlike a normal peacetime cabinet, few of these men had departmental responsibilities – Bonar Law, and then Chamberlain, served as chancellors of the exchequer, but the rest had no specific portfolio.  The title of, "Minister Without Portfolio" was important. It allowed total devotion to war duties, without the distraction of civil cabinet responsibilities.  Among others, the Foreign Secretary, Arthur Balfour, was never a member of the war cabinet, nor were the service ministers Lord Derby (Army) and Sir Edward Carson (Navy).  The latter did join, but only after leaving the Admiralty. Whenever these specialties were needed by the war cabinet, they were summoned.  The functioning of the war cabinet is best summed up by Lord Hutchison during a Parliamentary debate held on 14 March 1934.

Despite its efficiency, on 8 June 1917 at Lord Milner's urging, it became necessary to form a War Policy Committee within the War Cabinet to coordinate war strategy.  Its members included Lloyd George, Lord Milner, Lord Curzon, Jan Smuts, and Maurice Hankey. Upon his transfer from the War Cabinet to the War Office as Secretary of State for War in April 1918, the X Committee was created so Lord Milner could meet with the Prime Minister before War Cabinet sessions to continue the talks.

Previously, all cabinet members were paid based upon their cabinet status.  With the creation of Ministers Without Portfolio, it was suggested that these positions go unpaid.  Indeed, Lord Lansdowne, a millionaire, while a member without portfolio in Prime Minister Asquith's government, received no pay. The debate, which took place in the House of Commons on 13 February 1917, was decided in the new government's favour. Appropriations of £5,000 a year (£350,000 in 2020) were made.

The British War Cabinet marked the first time minutes were recorded of official meetings. This innovation set the trend for all important corporate and governmental meetings since.

With the World War over, and the two main peace treaties signed with Germany and Austria-Hungary, Lloyd George decided to discontinue the War Cabinet.  Its last meeting was held on 27 October 1919.

The Imperial War Cabinet

The origins of an Imperial War Cabinet date back to the beginning of Lloyd George's government, and the proper way of responding to peace offerings from Germany.  The first mention of a conference in the War Cabinet happened on 18 December 1916. In January invitations were sent out, and in the spring of 1917 the Imperial War Cabinet was formed.  Goals were also established to strengthen imperial federation by upgrading the status of the Dominions and India to an equal footing with that of England when coordinating war strategy.  The Imperial War Cabinet met in three sessions: from March to May 1917, from June to August 1918, and from August to December 1918. The last session was improvised.  It occurred due to Allied successes on the battlefield and a desire of dominion partners to keep abreast of events.  Its original members were:
 Arthur Henderson (British War Cabinet)
 Lord Alfred Milner (British War Cabinet)
 George Curzon (British War Cabinet)
 Bonar Law (British War Cabinet and future Prime Minister)
 Lloyd George (British War Cabinet and Prime Minister of Great Britain)
 Robert Borden (Prime Minister of Canada)
 W.F. Massey (Prime Minister of New Zealand)
 Jan Smuts (Minister for Defence, South Africa)
 S.P. Sinha (Representative of Bengal)
 Maharajah of Bikanir (King of (Northern) India)
 James Meston (Assistant to the Secretary of State for India, Great Britain)
 Austen Chamberlain (Secretary of State for India, Great Britain)
 Robert Cecil (Minister of Blockade, Great Britain)
 Walter Long (Secretary of State for the Colonies, Great Britain)
 Joseph Ward (Finance Minister of New Zealand)
 George Perley (Overseas War Minister of Canada)
 Robert Rogers (Minister of Public Works, Canada)
 J.D. Hazen (Minister of the Navy, Canada)
 Leopold Amery (Assistant Secretary from Great Britain)
 Admiral Jellicoe (First Sea Lord, Great Britain)
 Edward Carson (First Lord of the Admiralty (civilian head of the Navy), Great Britain)
 Lord Derby (Secretary of State for War, Great Britain)
 General Maurice (Director of Military Operations, Great Britain)
 Maurice Hankey (Assistant Secretary from Great Britain)
 Henry Lambert (Colonial Office, from Great Britain)
 Major Lancelot Storr (Assistant Secretary from Great Britain)

To strengthen ties between countries, the writing of an Imperial Constitution was a significant priority in 1917.  However, the delegates postponed the matter until after the war, and they failed to take it up.

Minutes to the Imperial War Cabinet meetings are held at the National Archives (Kew).

Second World War
Germany invaded Poland early on 1 September 1939, and after to-ing and fro-ing with French Foreign Minister Georges Bonnet, an ultimatum was presented to the Germans and on its expiry war was declared at 11am on 3 September 1939.

Chamberlain war ministry 

On 3 September 1939, Neville Chamberlain announced his War Cabinet.

Prime Minister: Neville Chamberlain (Cons)
Lord Privy Seal: Sir Samuel Hoare (Cons)
Chancellor of the Exchequer: Sir John Simon (Nat. Liberal)
Foreign Secretary: Viscount Halifax (Cons)
Secretary of State for War: Leslie Hore-Belisha (Nat. Liberal)
Secretary of State for Air: Sir Kingsley Wood (Cons)
First Lord of the Admiralty: Winston Churchill (Cons)
Minister for the Coordination of Defence: Lord Chatfield (Nat.)
Minister without Portfolio: Lord Hankey (Nat.)

Dominated largely by Conservative ministers who served under Chamberlain's National Government between 1937 and 1939, the additions of Lord Hankey (a former Cabinet Secretary from the First World War) and Winston Churchill (strong anti-appeaser) seemed to give the Cabinet more balance. Unlike Lloyd George's War Cabinet, the members of this one were also heads of government departments.

In January 1940, after disagreements with the Chiefs of Staff, Hore-Belisha resigned from the National Government, refusing a move to the post of President of the Board of Trade. He was succeeded by Oliver Stanley.

It was originally the practice for the Chiefs of Staff to attend all military discussions of the Chamberlain War Cabinet. Churchill became uneasy with this, as he felt that when they attended they did not confine their comments to purely military issues.  To overcome this, a Military Co-ordination Committee was set up, consisting of the three Service ministers normally chaired by Lord Chatfield.  This together with the Service chiefs would co-ordinate the strategic ideas of 'top hats' and 'brass' and agree strategic proposals to put forward to the War Cabinet.  Unfortunately, except when chaired by the Prime Minister, the Military Co-ordinating Committee lacked sufficient authority to override a Minister "fighting his corner".  When Churchill took over from Chatfield, whilst continuing to represent the Admiralty, this introduced additional problems, and did little to improve the pre-existing ones.  Chamberlain announced a further change in arrangements in the Norway debate, but this (and the Military Co-ordination Committee) was overtaken by events, the Churchill War Cabinet being run on rather different principles.

Churchill war ministry 

When he became Prime Minister during the Second World War, Winston Churchill formed a war cabinet, initially consisting of the following members:

 Prime Minister & Minister of Defence: Winston Churchill (Conservative)
 Lord President of the council: Neville Chamberlain (Conservative)
 Lord Privy Seal: Clement Attlee (Labour)
 Foreign Secretary: Lord Halifax (Conservative)
 Minister without Portfolio: Arthur Greenwood (Labour)

Churchill strongly believed that the War Cabinet should be kept to a relatively small number of individuals to allow efficient execution of the war effort. Even so, there were a number of ministers who, though they were not members of the war cabinet, were "Constant Attenders". As the War Cabinet considered issues that pertained to a given branch of the service or government due input was obtained from the respective body.

The War Cabinet would undergo a number of changes in composition over the next five years. On 19 February 1942 a reconstructed War Cabinet was announced by Churchill consisting of the following members:

Prime Minister and Minister of Defence Winston Churchill (Conservative)
Deputy Prime Minister and Secretary of State for Dominions Affairs: Clement Attlee (Labour)
Lord Privy Seal and Leader of the House of Commons: Sir Stafford Cripps (Labour)
Lord President of the council: John Anderson (National)
Foreign Secretary: Anthony Eden (Conservative)
Minister of Production: Oliver Lyttelton (Conservative)
Minister of Labour: Ernest Bevin (Labour)

This War Cabinet was consistent with Churchill's view that members should also hold "responsible offices and not mere advisors at large with nothing to do but think and talk and take decisions by compromise or majority" 
The War Cabinet often met within the Cabinet War Rooms, particularly during The Blitz of London.

Falklands War
Prime Minister – Margaret Thatcher
Deputy Prime Minister & Home Secretary – Willie Whitelaw
Secretary of State for Foreign & Commonwealth Affairs – Francis Pym
Secretary of State for Defence – John Nott
Chancellor of the Duchy of Lancaster – Cecil Parkinson
Chief of the Defence Staff – Admiral Lewin
Attorney General – Michael Havers

Thatcher chose not to include any representation of Her Majesty's Treasury on the advice of former Prime Minister Harold Macmillan (who had been British Minister Resident in the Mediterranean theatre for the second half of the Second World War), that the security and defence of the armed forces and the war effort should not be compromised for financial reasons.

Persian Gulf War
Prime Minister – John Major
Secretary of State for Foreign and Commonwealth Affairs – Douglas Hurd
Secretary of State for Defence – Tom King
Chancellor of the Exchequer – Norman Lamont
Chief of the Defence Staff – Marshal of the RAF Sir David Craig

Australia

At the Imperial Conference in London in 1937, the Australian government had agreed to form a War Cabinet on the outbreak of war. The Full Cabinet approved the formation of the War Cabinet on 26 September 1939. As neither Earle Page's Country Party nor John Curtin's Australian Labor Party would join in a coalition government with Menzies' United Australia Party, the War Cabinet initially consisted of:
 Robert Menzies (Prime Minister and Treasurer)
 Richard Casey (Minister for Supply)
 Geoffrey Street (Minister for Defence)
 George McLeay (Minister for Commerce)
 Henry Gullett (Minister for Information)
 William Hughes (Attorney-General)
In November 1939, the Department of Defence was split up. Street became Minister for the Army, Menzies also became Minister for Defence Coordination, and three more ministers joined the War Cabinet:
 James Fairbairn (Minister for Air)
 Frederick Stewart (Minister for the Navy)
 Harry Foll (Minister for Interior)

Following the deaths of Fairbairn and Gullett in the Canberra air disaster, 1940 and the loss of seats in the 1940 Australian federal election the War Cabinet of October 1940 consisted of:
 Robert Menzies (Prime Minister and Minister for Defence Coordination)
 Arthur Fadden (Treasurer)
 John McEwen (Minister for Air)
 Percy Spender (Minister for the Army)
 Billy Hughes (Attorney-General and Minister for the Navy)
 Harry Foll (Minister for Interior)
 Philip McBride (Minister for Munitions) (from 26 June 1941)

The government was replaced by a Labor one on 3 October 1941. A new War Cabinet was formed, consisting of:
 John Curtin (Prime Minister and Minister for Defence Coordination)
 Frank Forde (Minister for the Army)
 Ben Chifley (Treasurer)
 H. V. Evatt (Attorney-General and Minister for External Affairs)
 Jack Beasley (Minister for Supply)
 Norman Makin (Minister for the Navy and Minister for Munitions)
 Arthur Drakeford (Minister for Air)
 John Dedman (Minister for the Interior) (from 11 December 1941)

Frederick Shedden, the Permanent Secretary of the Department of Defence, served as secretary of the War Cabinet, which met regularly throughout the war. It held its last meeting in Canberra on 19 January 1946.

While the Australian war cabinets included only members of the governing party, the Advisory War Council which was established in October 1940 included members of the opposition as well. This body did not have executive powers, but from the formation of the Labor Government in October 1941 it was agreed that its decisions would be treated as War Cabinet decisions, with only some issues being formally referred to the War Cabinet for separate decision. As a result, the Advisory War Council had significant influence on Australia's war effort.

United States

In response to the September 11 attacks, President George W. Bush created a War Cabinet. They met at Camp David on the weekend of 15 September to shape what became the War on Terrorism. The membership was mostly, but not entirely, identical to that of the United States National Security Council.

The Cabinet comprised:
President – George W. Bush
Vice President – Dick Cheney
Defense Secretary – Donald Rumsfeld
Assistant to the President for National Security Affairs (National Security Advisor) – Condoleezza Rice
Secretary of State – Colin Powell
Director of Central Intelligence – George Tenet
Chairman of the Joint Chiefs of Staff – Hugh Shelton
Attorney General – John Ashcroft
Secretary of the Treasury – Paul O'Neill
Counselor to the President – Karen Hughes
White House Press Secretary – Ari Fleischer
Director of the Federal Bureau of Investigation – Robert Mueller
Deputy Defense Secretary – Paul Wolfowitz
White House Chief of Staff – Andrew Card

During the October 1962 Cuban Missile Crisis, President John F. Kennedy's EXCOMM had some characteristics of a War Cabinet.

Citations

Sources

 Amery, Leopold, My Political Life, Vol. II, War and Peace, 1914-1929, London: Hutchinson, 1953
 Archive.org (sign in to view references and sources)
 Le May, G.H.L., British Government, 1914-1963, London: Methuen, 1964
 
 
 Roskill, Stephen, Hankey, Man of Secrets, Volume I, 1877-1918, London: Collins, 1970
 Roskill, Stephen, Hankey, Man of Secrets, Volume II, 1919-1931, London: Collins, 1972
 Schuyler, Robert L., The British War Cabinet, Political Science Quarterly, New York: Academy of Political Science, Vol 33, No. 3, Sept. 1918
 UK National Archives, War Cabinet Minutes
 UK Govt Blog, 9 December 1916, The Rise of the War Cabinet
 Encyclopædia Britannica online, English Democracy
 CPI Index online UK inflation calculator
 Marlowe, John, Milner: Apostle of Empire, London: Hamish Hamilton, 1976

Further reading
 The War Cabinet, Report for the Year 1917, London: His Majesty's Stationery Office, 1918
 A summary of the (above) war cabinet report, CAB 23-5, pgs. 280, 326 of 475

People associated with war
Politics of the United Kingdom
Politics of Australia